Nithyakanyaka is a 1963 Indian Malayalam-language film directed by K. S. Sethumadhavan and produced by A. K. Balasubramaniam. The film stars Sathyan, Ragini, Thikkurissy Sukumaran Nair and Ambika. The film had musical score by G. Devarajan. This film is based on Edhir Paradhathu (1954), directed by Chitrapu Narayana Rao.

Cast
Sathyan 
Ragini 
Thikkurissy Sukumaran Nair 
Ambika 
Bahadoor 
Kambissery Karunakaran
Kottarakkara Sreedharan Nair
Santo Krishnan

Soundtrack

References

External links
 

1963 films
1960s Malayalam-language films
Films directed by K. S. Sethumadhavan